Working Mom Parenting Daddy is a 2016 South Korean television series starring Hong Eun-hee, Park Gun-hyung, Han Ji-sang, Shin Eun-jung and . It aired on MBC every Mondays to Fridays at 20:55 (KST) for 120 episodes from May 9 to November 11, 2016.

Cast

Main cast
Hong Eun-hee as Lee Mi-so
Park Gun-hyung as Kim Jae-min
 as Joo Ye-eun
Han Ji-sang as Cha Il-mok
Shin Eun-jung as Yoon Jeong-hyun
 as Park Hyuk-gi

People around Lee Mi-so
Goo Geon-min as Kim Bang-geul
Gil Hae-yeon as Lee Hae-soon

People around Joo Ye-eun
Go Seung-bo as Cha Min-ho
Lee Kyung-jin as Ok Soo-ran
 as young Soo-ran

People around Yoon Jeong-hyun
Go Na-hee as Park Eun-sol

Ritz Electronic
  as Oh Sang-sik
  as Park Jin-sung
 as Yoo Han-moo
 as Kim Heung-bok
 as Kwon Jeong-hoon (Human Resource Management team's vice-chief)
Baek Min as Go Jin-ho (Head of Disciplinary Committee)
N/A as Deputy Choi

Extended cast
 as Park Hyuk-gi's friend
Lee Yeon-seon as Yoo-ra's mother
N/A as Chan-ho's mother
Yang So-min
Kim Bibi

Kwon Young-kyung
Choi Moon-jeong
Gook Jeong-sook
Kim Hyun

Kim Mi-rim
Park Gi-hoon
Baek Min
Yeo Woon-bok

Cameo appearances
Yoo Jun-sang as Lee Moon-han

Ratings
In the table below, the blue numbers represent the lowest ratings and the red numbers represent the highest ratings.

Awards and nominations

References

External links
  
 
 Working Mom Parenting Daddy at Daum 
 Working Mom Parenting Daddy at Naver Movies 

2016 South Korean television series debuts
2016 South Korean television series endings
MBC TV television dramas
Korean-language television shows